The Ópera do Tejo (Tagus Opera) or Real Casa da Ópera (Royal Opera House) was a luxurious opera house in Lisbon, Portugal. It was inaugurated on March 31, 1755, and destroyed by the 1755 Lisbon earthquake on November 1 of the same year.

The theater was located in the historic center of Lisbon, next to the Tagus river in the  area, attached to the old Ribeira Palace.

The project was commissioned by José I of Portugal for the Italian architect Giovanni Carlo Galli da Bibbiena. The hall had capacity for 600 people on the floor and in 38 boxes.

The theater was opened with the opera Alessandro nell'Indie by Davide Perez, with libretto by Pietro Metastasio.

See also
List of theatres and auditoriums in Lisbon

Notes

External links
 
 Ópera do Tejo virtual site

Opera houses in Portugal
Music venues completed in 1755
Theatres completed in 1755
Buildings and structures demolished in 1755
1755 disestablishments in Portugal
Former buildings and structures in Portugal
Theatres in Lisbon